Saint-Genis-Pouilly is a commune in the Ain department within the Auvergne-Rhône-Alpes region of eastern France.

It is located in the Pays de Gex, at the foot of the Jura Mountains. Bordering the Swiss frontier, it is part of the cross-border area of Geneva.
With a population of almost 14,000 inhabitants (2019), it is the fifth most populous commune in the department of Ain.

A large portion of CERN, the European laboratory for particle physics, is located within the territory of Saint-Genis-Pouilly; the ALICE experiment is located on the periphery of the town, and the main entrance to the primary CERN campus (Meyrin) and the ATLAS experiment are located only 3 km from the centre of St Genis. CERN is the world's largest fundamental physics research laboratory and its presence  has largely been responsible for the development of the community of Saint Genis since the middle of the 1960s.

Geography
Saint-Genis-Pouilly is composed of two market towns (Saint-Genis and Pouilly) and two hamlets (Pregnin and Flies).
The two market towns have both continued to expand and  now practically merge into one, however the two hamlets still remain separate from each other and from the two towns.
The elevation of the commune varies from 419 m (at the extreme south of the commune, to the confluence of the rivers Allondon and Nant de l'Ecra) to 502 m (at the extreme north of the commune, in the village of Flies).
The commune is situated at the limit between the plains surrounding Geneva and the first foothills of the Jura.
As indicated on the map opposite, the communes surrounding Saint-Genis-Pouilly are: Thoiry, Sergy, Crozet, Chevry, Prévessin-Moëns and Satigny (Swiss).

Hydrology
Many water courses traverse or border Saint-Genis-Pouilly: Lion, Allondon, Nant de l'Ecra, Bief de la Janvoin, Ouaf, Grand Journans and Petit Journans.
In 2005 and 2006, these water courses were subject to a ban on water extraction as a result of the drought. In 2004, only the Allondon and the Lion would have been restricted.
The depth of the Allondon is measured at Saint-Genis-Pouilly by a network HYDRO  station which transmits these readings by telephone.

Climate
The meteorological station situated at Geneva International Airport, Cointrin,  furnishes measurements of the weather relevant to Saint-Genis-Pouilly.
This station is situated only  km from the centre of the commune and at a similar elevation ( m).
Data from this station is available in real time from MétéoSuisse.

Saint-Genis-Pouilly, like the whole of the Pays de Gex and the Canton of Geneva, knows the touch of the Joran, the cold wind which descends towards Lac Léman from the high Jura, where it sometimes provokes a storm.

Natural risks
According to a study  made in 2002, commissioned by the Department of Agriculture and the Forests of Ain, Saint-Genis-Pouilly is classed in a zone at risk from flooding. According to another official publication,
the commune is classed in a zone at risk from torrential downpours and rapid flooding.
However, according to the list of major risks 
to Saint-Genis-Pouilly published on the portal of the website of the Ministry of Ecology, "Prevention of major risks", the commune is classed in a zone at risk from overcrowding from man's activities.
These three different qualifications of risk cannot be explained.

Along with the other communes in the canton of Gex, Saint-Genis-Pouilly is classed in seismic zone Ib, which is to say that the seismic risk is low.
A new classification is being prepared by the Ministry of Ecology,
but it does not seem that this will significantly change the classification of the communes in the Pays de Gex.

Nature zones
That part of the Allondon valley which is found within the territory of the commune constitutes a natural zone with interesting ecology, fauna and flora
(ZNIEFF type I).

The commune is sparsely wooded: the area occupied by forests is 7%.

History
It was in 1887 that the current name, Saint-Genis-Pouilly, first appeared on the State civil registers. Previously, Saint-Genis-Pouilly was called Pouilly-Saint-Genis. Before that, the two towns were separately identified. Historically the spelling Saint-Genix had been widely used.

In his historical Atlas, G. Debombourg placed Pulliacum in the epoque of the second reign of the Bourgogne (879-1032) and he placed the church of Pouilly-St-Genis on the religious maps.
In these "Preuves" he cites a text of 993 which mentions Pulliacum.

A diary of 1698 mentions a certain Balthazard as a noble of Prengin, in the Pays de Gex (perhaps this is the name given during this epoque to the current hamlet of Pregnin). Between 1601 and 1789 mention is made of the Baronnie of Saint-Genist.

Names of the area with a Gallo-Romanic origin, Polliacum, Pulliacum, derived, with the suffix -acum from the root name  Paulius or Pollius.

Towards the end of this time, Saint Genis took on a greater importance. Its takeover of the Postes Royales (next to the current chapel) kickstarted the growth of the town and Pouilly-Saint-Genix soon became Saint-Genis-Pouilly.

Pregnin figures in the Procès-verbaux du Directoire.
The name of Saint-Genis, as in the case of Saint-Genis-Laval, probably comes from Saint Genest, a Roman comedian from the second half of the 3rd century, martyred under Diocletian.

Roman period
The Roman colony Colonia Iulia Equestris founded by Julius Caesar between 50 and 45 BC extended as far as Thoiry and included the territory which was to become Saint-Genis-Pouilly.

The villa of Pouilly had been occupied by a rich family, as evidenced by the jewelry found there.

The place called les châtelets, situated to the north of Pregnin took its name,  without doubt, from the presence in the 2nd century of a small fort situated on the Roman road running along the Jura.

Middle Ages
A priory was established at Pouilly at the end of the 10th century.

In 1301, Uldric, the Seigneur of Saint-Genis renewed his allegiance to the Dauphin.

18th century
Cassini's map of 18th century Geneva,  based on measurements taken by Calon de Felcourt between 1759 and 1761, shows the town of Pouilly and the hamlets of Pregnin and Flies. A windmill on the site of St Genis can also be identified.
The road from Lyon to Geneva and the fork towards Gex are also clearly visible. These roads, easily identifiable by the route they trace through the Pays de Gex, still exist today.

Notable events
A few (albeit rather rare) events in the history of the commune :

Today
It was the extension within France of  CERN (the European Organization for Nuclear Research) in the middle of the 1960s which made Saint-Genis-Pouilly the little town ("coquette") that it is today.
It is also thanks to the presence of CERN that the local economy has undergone considerable growth and diversification.

Coat of arms
Until recently, the commune used an azure coat of arms with three gold towers. Today, the commune uses exclusively a modern logo which figures prominently on the pages of its Web site and in its publications.

Population
The population of Saint-Genis-Pouilly has grown rapidly since the middle of the 1960s, largely due to the activities of CERN:

One of the consequences of this rapid expansion of the population (along with those of the neighbouring communes in France and Switzerland) is the rapid increase in house prices.
For example, the price per square metre of an apartment in the Pays de Gex increased by 59% between 2000 and 2004, according to INSEE.

Its inhabitants are known as Saint-genésiens.

An international population
In addition to CERN, the proximity of Switzerland and the international organisations headquartered in Geneva explains why a significant proportion of the population of the commune are foreigners.
According to the census taken by INSEE in 2017, the commune contained amongst its  inhabitants  foreigners (making 35.2%).
By way of comparison, the département of Ain contains, also in 2017, amongst its  inhabitants  foreigners (making 8.7%).

Housing
, most housing in Saint-Genis-Pouilly is in apartment blocks (70.9%) and individual houses (27.5%). The apartment blocks are concentrated in the town of Saint-Genis. The commune has a significantly larger proportion of apartments than the other communes in the department: 35.5% of dwellings in Ain are apartments.

The majority of the population in the Pays de Gex, Ain, the Rhône-Alpes region, and mainland France are owner-occupiers of their homes. In Saint-Genis-Pouilly, by contrast, the majority of the population live in rented accommodation (only 46.3% of individual residences are owner-occupied). Within the Pays de Gex, only Ferney-Voltaire has a lower proportion of owner occupiers (39.1%). It is possible that this peculiarity is explained by the large number of employees living in the two communities who work for international organisations.

Administration

Elections
The commune is presently administered by M. H. Bertrand and his team. The results of the second round of the municipal elections on 18 March 2001 was as follows:

In total, from the  registered electors, there were  votes cast and  votes counted.

Municipal budget
The commune expended in 2005 a total revenue spend of €6.64 million and a total capital investment of €4.06 million, however these figures have increased to €7.96 million (revenue) and €3.69 million (capital). It has therefore reached an overall positive result of €0.96 million this year.

Local taxation

For several years the rate of the Taxe d'habititation (local council tax) has been fixed at %. As indicated on the chart opposite this rate was, in 2006, approximately equal to the average for the Pays de Gex: %.

Cantonal elections

National referendums
 No (40.86%).

 No (33.15%).

The inhabitants of Saint-Genis-Pouilly are therefore more europhile than the rest of the French population who rejected the Treaty establishing a constitution for Europe, and approved by only a slim majority (51.04%) the Treaty of Maastricht.

Note: Unless indicated otherwise, the results presented above are taken from the  Ministry of the Interior.

Cultural life

Heritage
The church of Saint Pierre at Pouilly (porch and choir from the  13th century) is without doubt the most well known element of religious architecture in the commune. The church is Roman, except for the choir which is Gothic.

Some ruins from the small fortified château (from 13th century) are still visible in Flies.
Gallo-Roman sepulchres and others from the 6th-8th centuries can still be found in the cemetery surrounding the church at  Pouilly.

Science
CERN brings to the community an opening on to the world of physics which is perhaps unique in the world. Conferences are very frequently organised and some of these are open to the public. It is possible to visit the exhibition centre at CERN and also, with a prior appointment, to make a half day visit to CERN itself.

Theatre
The construction of the Théâtre du Bordeau has finished and the theatre is now open. This modern theatre offers a 250-seat auditorium for use by amateur dramatic groups, dance, music and other dramatic arts.

Sculpture and related subjects
Pregn'Art is an annual weekend event in the course of which several local artists exhibit their work in the gardens of the inhabitants of the hamlet of Pregnin. It is one of the events dedicated to sculpture and related subjects.

Traditions and folklore
The principal fete of the commune is the Bird Festival "La fête de l'oiseau", which took place between 4 and 7 June on 2010.

Recreation
The municipal swimming pool is the Piscine municipale de Saint-Genis.

Economic life
Since the creation of the Technoparc, Saint-Genis-Pouilly has become a centre of economic activity in the Pays de Gex.

Free trade zone
Saint-Genis-Pouilly benefits, as do all the other communes in the Pays de Gex, from the specific laws implementing the free trade zone. Under this arrangement, merchandise imported or exported to and from the European Union is not subject to customs duty.
If this law has known important changes in the past,
it seems to have stabilised today.

Unemployment
According to the annual employment survey carried out by INSEE in 2017, the unemployment rate in the commune was 10.2% (compared to 8.3% in 2007).

Education
Preschool and primary school groups include Groupe scolaire du Jura, Groupe scolaire du Lion, Groupe scolaire de Pregnin, and Groupe scolaire Boby Lapointe.

The local junior high school is Collège Jacques Prévert, it opened in 1974 whilst using the École du Lion facilities and moved into its permanent facility in 1975.

Lycée international de Ferney-Voltaire has a branch campus in Saint-Genis-Pouilly, which opened in 2016. it is in the Porte de France Nord development.

Médiathèque George Sand, which has media for rental, is in the commune.

References

External links

  Official site
  Pays de Gex
 Technoparc - Pays de Gex

Communes of Ain
Ain communes articles needing translation from French Wikipedia